Hugo Edgar Maxwell Blick (born 7 December 1964) is a British filmmaker and actor. He has his own production company, called Eight Rooks.

Early life 
Hugo Blick studied in Cardiff at the Royal Welsh College of Music and Drama.

Career 
He has acted in several films, appearing as a Young Jack Napier, the character who would ultimately become The Joker in Tim Burton's Batman. He delivers the famous line "Have you ever danced with the devil by the pale moon light?" after having killed the young Bruce Wayne's parents.

He also co-wrote along with Simon Petter the TV series The Last Word Monologues, a series of three shorts featuring Sheila Hancock, Rhys Ifans and Bob Hoskins. He has also had producer credits on several works including Roger & Val Have Just Got In starring Dawn French and Alfred Molina.

As a writer he co-created, produced and co-directed along with Simon Petter the TV comedies Marion and Geoff with Rob Brydon, Operation Good Guys in which he also appeared as 'Smiler' McCarthy and wrote and created the noir thriller The Shadow Line (2011) for the BBC, which starred Chiwetel Ejiofor and Christopher Eccleston.

In 2014, Hugo Blick wrote and directed the BBC drama series The Honourable Woman, which won a Peabody Award and Golden Globe Award. In 2017, it was announced that Blick would write and direct Black Earth Rising for BBC Two and Netflix. In 2021, it was announced that Blick would direct The English, a western with Emily Blunt, which he also wrote, for BBC Two and Amazon Prime Video. The series debuted on 10 November 2022, on BBC Two.

Filmography

Producer/director/writer 
 1997: Operation Good Guys
 2000: Marion and Geoff
 2001: A Small Summer Party
 2002: Up in Town
 2005: Sensitive Skin
 2008: The Last Word Monologues
 2010: Roger & Val Have Just Got In (Executive Producer)
 2011: The Shadow Line
 2014: The Honourable Woman
 2014: Sensitive Skin
 2018: Black Earth Rising
 2022: The English

Actor 
 1989: Batman – Young Jack Napier
 1989: Blackadder Goes Forth – Lieutenant von Gerhardt
 1989: A Connecticut Yankee in King Arthur's Court – Mordred
 1990: Jeeves and Wooster – Claude Wooster
 1992: Christopher Columbus: The Discovery – De Torres
 1994: Flush – Executive
 1996: The Wind in the Willows – Justin
 1997: Operation Good Guys – Narrator / 'Smiler' McCarthy’ / Hugo Crippin
 2005: Sensitive Skin – G.I. Johnson
 2018: Black Earth Rising – Blake Gaines

Self 
 2015: 67th Primetime Emmy Awards – Self–Nominee

References

External links 

1964 births
Living people
English screenwriters
English male screenwriters
English male television actors
People from South Oxfordshire District
People from Henley-on-Thames
20th-century English writers
20th-century English male writers
21st-century English writers